This is a list of winners and nominees of the Primetime Emmy Award for Outstanding Music Composition for a Series.

Starting in 2019, the category recognizes scripted programs. Unscripted programs compete for Music Composition for a Documentary Series or Special.

Winners and nominations

1960s

Note: Award titled Outstanding Individual Achievements in Music Composition (1966–69)

1970s

1980s

1990s

2000s

2010s

2020s

Total awards by network

 CBS – 12
 ABC – 7
 NBC – 6
 Fox – 3
 PBS – 3
 Syndicated – 3
 Discovery Channel – 2
 Disney+ – 2
 HBO – 2
 Netflix – 3
 UPN – 2
 The WB – 2
  Apple TV+ – 1
 Showtime – 1
 USA – 1

Programs with multiple awards

3 awards
 24

2 awards
 Beauty and the Beast
 Dallas (consecutive)
 Downton Abbey (consecutive)
 Game of Thrones (consecutive)
 Hawaii Five-O
 House of Cards
 Little House on the Prairie
 The Mandalorian (consecutive)
 The Young Indiana Jones Chronicles (consecutive)

Programs with multiple nominations

12 nominations
 The Simpsons (Fox)

8 nominations
 24 (Fox)

6 nominations
 Dallas (CBS)

5 nominations
 Hawaii Five-O (CBS)
 House of Cards (Netflix)
 Star Trek: The Next Generation (Syndicated)
 Star Trek: Voyager (UPN)
 The X-Files (Fox)
 Xena: Warrior Princess (Syndicated)

4 nominations
 Little House on the Prairie (NBC)
 Lou Grant (ABC)
 Moonlighting (CBS)

3 nominations
 Beauty and the Beast (CBS)
 Columbo (NBC)
 The Crown (Netflix)
 Downton Abbey (PBS)
 Family Guy (Fox)
 Game of Thrones (HBO)
 I Spy (NBC)
 Lost (ABC)
 Love, American Style (ABC)
 Matlock (NBC)
 Mission: Impossible (CBS)
 Murder, She Wrote (CBS)
 Run for Your Life (NBC)
 SeaQuest DSV (NBC)
 The Young Indiana Jones Chronicles (ABC)

2 nominations
 Bonanza (NBC)
 The Borgias (Showtime)
 Bronk (CBS)
 CBS Playhouse (CBS)
 Chef's Table (Netflix)
 The Days and Nights of Molly Dodd (NBC)
 Dynasty (ABC)
 Enterprise (UPN)
 Ghost Whisperer (CBS)
 Gunsmoke (CBS)
 The Handmaid's Tale (Hulu)
 House (Fox)
 JAG (CBS)
 Knots Landing (CBS)
 The Mandalorian (Disney+)
 Miami Vice (NBC)
 Penny Dreadful (Showtime)
 Rome (HBO)
 Roots (ABC)
 St. Elsewhere (NBC)
 Succession (HBO)
 30 Rock (NBC)
 This Is Us (NBC)

Composers with multiple awards

3 awards
 Bruce Broughton
 Sean Callery
 David Rose

2 awards
 Jeff Beal
 Don Davis
 John Debney
 Ramin Djawadi
 George Fenton
 Billy Goldenberg
 Ludwig Göransson
 Joseph LoDuca
 John Lunn
 Joel Rosenbaum
 Laurence Rosenthal
 Morton Stevens

Composers with multiple nominations

16 nominations
 Alf Clausen

10 nominations
 Sean Callery
 Patrick Williams

8 nominations
 Jeff Beal
 Dennis McCarthy
 David Rose

7 nominations
 Mark Snow

6 nominations
 Bruce Broughton
 Billy Goldenberg
 Joseph LoDuca
 Angela Morley
 Morton Stevens

5 nominations
 Ramin Djawadi
 Bruce Babcock
 Don Davis
 W. G. Snuffy Walden

4 nominations
 Jay Chattaway
 Dick DeBenedictis
 Charles Fox
 Pete Rugolo
 Lalo Schifrin
 Nan Schwartz

3 nominations
 Jon Ehrlich
 Michael Giacchino
 Earle Hagen
 Siddhartha Khosla
 John Lunn
 Martin Phipps
 Joel Rosenbaum
 Laurence Rosenthal

2 nominations
 Chris Bacon
 Steven Bramson
 Nicholas Britell
 Velton Ray Bunch
 John Cacavas
 John Debney
 Jason Derlatka
 Robert Duncan
 George Fenton
 Gerald Fried
 Joel Goldsmith
 Ludwig Göransson
 Jan Hammer
 Natalie Holt
 Quincy Jones
 Ron Jones
 Fred Karlin
 Laura Karpman
 Abel Korzeniowski
 Trevor Morris
 Blake Neely
 J. A. C. Redford
 Jeff Richmond
 Adam Taylor
 Duncan Thum
 Jack Urbont

References

Film music awards
Music Composition for a Series